Francesca Beauman (born 12 April 1977) is a writer, historian, and television presenter living in both London, England, and Los Angeles, California.

Education
Beauman grew up in Hampstead, London, and studied at the University of Cambridge, graduating with a first class degree in history. She wrote her dissertation on the history of the pineapple.

Career
While at Cambridge, Beauman formed a comedy act with Ania Dykczak. They went on to host a number of British television shows, including Ania, Fran and a Kettle of Fish (Channel 5, 2000), Show Me The Funny (Channel 4, 2002), Bring It On (BBC One, 2003–2004) and Heroes of History (Channel 5, 2005). Beauman was a contributor to My Famous Family and Britain's Best on UKTV History and also appeared as a guest panelist on Quote Unquote and Museum of Curiosity on BBC Radio 4.

Beauman is also a writer and historian. She is the author of the following books:
 The Literary Almanac: A Year of Seasonal Reading (2021)
 Matrimony, Inc.: From Personal Ads to Swiping Right, a Story of America Looking for Love (2020)
 How To Wear White: A Pocketbook for the Bride-to-Be (2013)
 How To Crack An Egg With One Hand: A Pocketbook for the New Mother (2011)
 Shapely Ankle Preferr'd: A History of Lonely Hearts Ads, 1695–2010 (2011). She is the leading expert on the history of Lonely Hearts ads, also known as personals.
 The Woman's Book (2007)
 The Pineapple: King of Fruits (2005). She is the leading expert on the history of the pineapple.

Personal life
Beauman is married to the film director James Bobin, with whom she has three children. She is the daughter of Nicola Beauman (the founder of Persephone Books) and Christopher Beauman (economist). She has four siblings: Ned Beauman, William Lacey, Olivia Lacey and Josh Lacey.

References

External links
www.francescabeauman.com (Francesca Beauman's official website)
www.aniaandfran.co.uk (Unofficial Fran and Ania fan site)

1977 births
Living people
English historians
English women non-fiction writers
English television presenters
Alumni of the University of Cambridge
British women historians